Iceland competed at the 2012 European Athletics Championships held in Helsinki, Finland, from 27 June to 1 July 2012.

Results

Men

Track

Field

Combined

Women

Field

Sources
 

Nations at the 2012 European Athletics Championships
2012
European Athletics Championships